New York State Route 281 (NY 281) is a north–south state highway in central New York in the United States. The southern terminus of the route is at an intersection with NY 13 in the town of Cortlandville. Its northern terminus is at a junction with U.S. Route 11 and NY 80 near the village of Tully. NY 281 meets NY 90 in the village of Homer and connects to Interstate 81 twice. The route parallels I-81 for all but the southernmost  of its routing.

Route description

Cortlandville to Homer

NY 281 begins at an intersection with NY 13 (Tompkins Street) in the town of Cortlandville next to the Walden Oaks Country Club. NY 281 proceeds north on West Road, a four-lane commercial street through Cortlandville, soon intersecting with County Route 120 (CR 120; McLean Road). Retaining the commercial design, NY 281 crosses over a railroad line, passing west of State University of New York at Cortland. The route continues northeast, passing east of Cortland County–Chase Field Airport. At Luker Road, NY 281 becomes a four-lane commercial boulevard again, entering an at-grade interchange with NY 222 and soon an intersection with CR 111 (Kinney Gulf Road). 

After CR 111, NY 281 continues northeast as a two-lane boulevard through Cortlandville, crossing into the city of Cortland for a short distance near St. Mary's Cemetery. Through Cortland, NY 281 is a two-lane residential road, bending north at Wheeler Avenue. Near Harmony Circle, NY 281 crosses out of Cortland and returns to Cortlandville, changing names from West Road to West Homer Road. A short distance after the city line, NY 281 intersects with CR 115 (Fisher Avenue). The route remains residential for a distance, passing west of Cortland Country Club and soon crossing into the town of Homer. Just after that change, the route enters an at-grade interchange with unsigned NY 930Q, which connects to I-81. 

NY 281 proceeds northward through Homer, now with the name of South West Street, entering the village of Homer. The route passes east of Glenwood Cemetery, intersecting with NY 90 (Cayuga Street). NY 281 continues north through Homer, remaining a two-lane residential road. Near Grove Street, the route changes monikers to North West Street, crossing through a dense stretch of residences. After turning northeast, NY 281 intersects at-grade with NY 41 (Clinton Street), before continuing to Stanford Drive, which marks the end of the village of Homer. Back in the town of Homer, the route proceeds northeast through a rural stretch of Cortland County, winding northeast into a parallel with I-81.

Homer to Tully 
NY 281 continues north through Homer, passing a stretch of residences before an intersection with CR 102 (Cold Brook Road). Passing west of Lower Little York Lake, NY 281 enters the hamlet of Pratts Corners, where it becomes a two-lane residential street, intersecting with CR 109 (Little York Crossing Road). After CR 109, the route runs west of Upper Little York Lake, passing multiple homes and fields near the lakeside before intersecting with CR 109A (Little York Lake Road). After several blocks of paralleling, CR 109A bends back and terminates at NY 281 to the north. At that point, the route crosses into the town of Preble. 

In Preble, NY 281 proceeds northeast at a fork that serves as the southern terminus of CR 108A (Steger Road). NY 281 and CR 108A parallel, with the route coming within a mile (1.6 km) of I-81. A short distance to the north, the route enters the hamlet of Preble, with NY 281 becoming a two-lane residential street. Intersecting CR 108B (Preble Road), NY 281 bends northeast at another fork, this time with CR 104 (Song Lake Road). On this northeastern stretch, the route enters a diamond interchange with I-81 (exit 13). After I-81, NY 281 continues northeast for a short distance through Preble, turning north on a parallel of the northbound lanes of I-81.  

Now paralleling a railroad line, NY 281 intersects with CR 106 (Song Lake Crossing Road). Soon after intersecting with CR 106A (Tully Center Road), NY 281 turns northwest, crossing the county line into Onondaga County. Right at the county line, NY 281 intersects with CR 257 (Marybelle Road), now in the town of Tully. The route bends northward, intersecting with CR 134 (Meeting House Road) as a two-lane rural road. A short distance to the north, I-81's exit 14 intersects with NY 281, which serves as a frontage road to an intersection with NY 80 and US 11. This intersection serves as the northern terminus of NY 281, while the right-of-way continues north as US 11.

History

NY 281 was assigned  to the portion of its alignment between NY 90 in the village of Homer and the hamlet of Preble. In the vicinity of Preble, it initially used modern County Routes 108A and 108B to reach U.S. Route 11. The route was extended northward along the western edge of Tully Lake , following Song Lake and Long Roads to a junction with NY 80 west of Tully Center. It was extended southward to NY 13 in the town of Cortlandville at some point between 1934 and 1940. In the late 1940s, construction began on a new highway between Preble and Tully Center that bypassed Preble and Tully Lake to the east. It was completed by 1949, at which time it became part of a realigned NY 281.

In February 1965, the New York State Department of Public Works proposed to renumber NY 281 as NY 357 to eliminate confusion between I-81, NY 80, NY 181 and US 11, aside of Interstate 281. The state would be asking communities along NY 281 for their approval to make the change. On March 8, 1965, the Board of Directors of the Cortland County Chamber of Commerce voted unanimously to oppose the renumbering, following actions of the Cortland County Motel Association, who mounted an even larger opposition. On March 30, it was announced that the decision to renumber NY 281 was withdrawn citing massive opposition.

Major intersections

See also

References

External links

281
Transportation in Onondaga County, New York
Transportation in Cortland County, New York